Lumuli is an administrative ward in the Iringa Rural district of the Iringa Region of Tanzania. In 2016 the Tanzania National Bureau of Statistics report there were 8,216 people in the ward, from 7,852 in 2012.

Villages / vitongoji 
The ward has 4 villages and 22 vitongoji.

 Lumuli
 Kalengachwa
 Kibalali
 Kihata
 Kihesa
 Kilimahewa
 Kitemela
 Lugema
 Uhopela
 Vikula
 Itengulinyi
 Ipangani
 Itengulinyi
 Lukingita
 Makanyagio A
 Makanyagio B
 Isupilo
 Isupilo
 Makanyagio
 Masumbo
 Usambusi
 Muwimbi
 Gezaulole
 Kibugumo
 Muwimbi
 Ulete

References 

Wards of Iringa Region